Floating solar or floating photovoltaics (FPV), sometimes called floatovoltaics, are solar panels mounted on a structure that floats on a body of water, typically a reservoir or a lake such as drinking water reservoirs, quarry lakes, irrigation canals or remediation and tailing ponds. A small number of such systems exist in China,France, India, Japan, South Korea, the United Kingdom, Singapore, and the United States.

The systems are said to have advantages over photovoltaics (PV) on land. Water surfaces may be less expensive than the cost of land, and there are fewer rules and regulations for structures built on bodies of water not used for recreation. Life cycle analysis indicates that foam-based FPV have some of the lowest energy payback times (1.3 years) and the lowest greenhouse gas emissions to energy ratio (11 kg CO2 eq/MWh) in crystalline silicon solar photovoltaic technologies reported.

Unlike most land-based solar plants, floating arrays can be unobtrusive because they are hidden from public view. They can achieve higher efficiencies than PV panels on land because water cools the panels. The panels can have a special coating to prevent rust or corrosion.

In May 2008, the Far Niente Winery in Oakville, California, pioneered the world's first floatovoltaic system by installing 994 solar PV modules with a total capacity of 477 kW onto 130 pontoons and floating them on the winery's irrigation pond. Several utility-scale floating PV farms have been built. Kyocera developed what was the world's largest, a 13.4 MW farm on the reservoir above Yamakura Dam in Chiba Prefecture using 50,000 solar panels. Salt-water resistant floating farms are also being constructed for ocean use. The largest announced floatovoltaic project as of 2015 is a 350 MW power station in the Amazon region of Brazil.

The market for this renewable energy technology has grown rapidly since 2016. The first 20 plants with capacities of a few dozen kWp were built between 2007 and 2013. Installed power reached 3 GW in 2020, with 10 GW predicted by 2025.

The costs for a floating system are about 20-25% higher than for ground-mounted systems.

Technology features 
There are several reasons for this development:

No land occupancy: The main advantage of floating PV plants is that they do not take up any land, except the limited surfaces necessary for electric cabinet and grid connections. Their price is comparable with land based plants, but floatovoltaics provide a good way to avoid land consumption.
Installation and decommissioning: Floating PV plants are more compact than land-based plants, their management is simpler and their construction and decommissioning straightforward. The main point is that no fixed structures exist like the foundations used for a land-based plant so their installation can be totally reversible.
Water conservation and water quality: Partial coverage of water basins can reduce water evaporation. This result depends on climate conditions and on the percentage of the covered surface. In arid climates such as parts of India this is an important advantage since about 30% of the evaporation of the covered surface is saved. This may be greater in Australia, and is a very useful feature if the basin is used for irrigation purposes. Water conservation from FPV is substantial and can be used to protect disappearing terminal natural lakes and other bodies of fresh water.
Increased panel efficiency due to cooling: the cooling effect of the water close to the PV panels leads to an energy gain that ranges from 5% to 15%. Natural cooling can be increased by a water layer on the PV modules or by submerging them, the so-called SP2 (Submerged Photovoltaic Solar Panel).
Tracking: Large floating platforms can easily be rotated horizontally and vertically to enable Sun-tracking (similar to sunflowers). Moving solar arrays uses little energy and doesn't need a complex mechanical apparatus like land-based PV plants. Equipping a floating PV plant with a tracking system costs little extra while the energy gain can range from 15% to 25%.
Environment control: Algal blooms, a serious problem in industrialized countries, may be reduced. The partial coverage of the basins and the reduction of light on biological fouling just below the surface, together with active systems, can solve this problem. Partial coverage is only a part of the more general problem of managing a water basin generated by and/or polluted by industrial activities.
Floating solar is often installed on existing hydropower. This allows for additional benefits and cost reductions such as using the existing transmission lines and distribution infrastructure. FPV provides a potentially profitable means of reducing water evaporation in the world's at-risk bodies of fresh water. For example, a case study of Lake Mead found that if 10% of the lake was covered with FPV, there would be enough water conserved and electricity generated to service Las Vegas and Reno combined. At 50% coverage, FPV would provide over 127 TWh of clean solar electricity and 633.22 million m3 of water savings, which would provide enough electricity to retire 11% of the polluting coal-fired plants in the U.S. and provide water for over five million Americans, annually.

Challenges 
Floating solar presents several challenges to designers:

Electrical safety and long-term reliability of system components: Operating on water over its entire service life, the system is required to have significantly increased corrosion resistance and long-term floatation capabilities (redundant, resilient, distributed floats), particularly when installed over salt water.
Waves: The floating PV system (wires, physical connections, floats, panels) needs to be able to withstand relatively higher winds (than on land) and heavy waves, particularly in off-shore or near-shore installations.
Maintenance complexity: Operation and maintenance activities are, as a general rule, more difficult to perform on water than on land.

History 

American, Danish, French, Italian and Japanese nationals were the first to register patents for floating solar. In Italy the first registered patent regarding PV modules on water goes back to February 2008.

The first floating solar installation was in Aichi, Japan, in 2007.

The MIRARCO (Mining Innovation Rehabilitation and Applied Research Corporation Ontario, CANADA) research group quotes several solutions that were put forward in 2008-2011 and 2012-2014. Most of the installations can be classified into three categories:

 PV plants constituted by modules mounted on pontoons 
 PV modules mounted on rafts built in plastic and galvanized steel 
 PV modules mounted on rafts, fully in plastic.

Largest floating solar facilities

Underwater solar 
In addition to conventional FPV there are also a number of studies that have looked at underwater FPV systems called submerged PV. Due to losses from solar flux being absorbed by the water underwater photovoltaic systems tend to be encouraged for low power applications like sensing. The efficiency limits for conventional crystalline silicon solar cells indicate that higher bandgap PV materials would be more appropriate for submerged PV. Although the light intensity under water decreases with an increase in depths, the rate of decrease in power output for both dye sensitized solar cells (DSSCs) and amorphous silicon-based thin film solar cells both outperform conventional  traditional monocrystalline and polycrystalline silicon PV by more than 20–25%. Applications includes:

 solar powered unmanned underwater vehicles (UUV’s); 
 solar pool heater; 
 energy storage facility; 
 offshore wind turbine foundation monitoring; 
 bridges and underwater tunnel monitoring; 
 algae farming; 
 desalination and salt farming; 
 marine life exploration.

See also 

 Solar canal 
 Photovoltaics

References

Further reading

Howard, E. and Schmidt, E. 2008. Evaporation control using Rio Tinto's Floating Modules on Northparks Mine, Landloch and NCEA. National Centre for Engineering in Agriculture Publication 1001858/1, USQ, Toowoomba.
 

 

Solar power
Renewable energy
Sustainable energy